This is a list of the second wave of 2020 Women's March events in October, most of which took place on October 17, and some later.


United States

Listed below are the marches in the U.S.

References

External links 

2020 in American politics
2020 in North America
2020 in women's history
2020 protests
2020-related lists
Feminism-related lists
Foreign relations of the United States
Gatherings of women
History of women's rights
Human rights-related lists
October 2020 events
Lists of places
Protest marches
Protests against Donald Trump
Reactions to the election of Donald Trump
List of 2020 Women's March locations
Women's marches